The 2021 Palmas FR plane crash took place on January 24, 2021, when a private Beechcraft Baron belonging to the Palmas Futebol e Regatas association football team crashed shortly after departing Palmas–Brigadeiro Lysias Rodrigues Airport in Brazil. The aircraft crashed on the way to Goiânia, killing all six people on board: four members of the football team, the team's owner, and the pilot. The flight was en route to a regional cup football game between Palmas and Vila Nova, for the Brazilian Copa Verde championship.

Victims
In a statement released to various media outlets such as CNN Brazil, it was announced that six deaths had occurred. Among the victims of the crash were identified as football players Marcus Molinari, Lucas Praxedes, Guilherme Noé,  and Ranule, team president Lucas Meira plus the pilot Wagner Machado. The four footballers who died had been travelling separately from the rest of their team because they had tested positive for COVID-19.

See also
LaMia Flight 2933, another air crash involving a Brazilian football team

References

2021 in Brazil
Aviation accidents and incidents in Brazil
Palmas
Aviation accidents and incidents involving professional sports teams
January 2021 events in Brazil
2021 disasters in Brazil
Palmas Futebol e Regatas
Accidents and incidents involving the Beechcraft Baron